Wilkinsons may refer to:

The Wilkinsons, a country music group
The Wilkinsons (TV series), a reality TV show following the group of the same name
Wilko (formerly known as Wilkinson) a British store

See also
Wilkinson (disambiguation)